Emma Maria Carlsson Löfdahl, formerly Emma Löfdahl Landberg (born Andersson on 26 September 1970), is a former member of the Riksdag (MP) from Jönköping County constituency. Formerly a member of the Liberals (L), she has been an independent politician since March 2019. In 2021, she announced that she would leave the Riksdag effective 1 August 2021. She was succeeded by Liberal MP Jakob Olofsgård.

See also 
 Member of Parliament (Sweden)

References

External links 
Official website

1970 births
Members of the Riksdag 2006–2010
Members of the Riksdag 2018–2022
Members of the Riksdag from the Liberals (Sweden)
Women members of the Riksdag
Living people
21st-century Swedish women politicians
People from Jönköping Municipality